José Luis Alonso de Santos (born 23 August 1942) is a Spanish dramatist.

Santos was born in Valladolid.  His play Bajarse al moro won Spain's 1985 National Theater Prize.

Works

Performed plays

¡Viva el Duque, nuestro dueño! (1975).
Del laberinto al 30 (1979). 
La verdadera y singular historia de la princesa y el dragón (1980). 
El álbum familiar (1982). 
Golfus Emerita Augusta (1982). 
El Gran Pudini (1983). 
Besos para la Bella Durmiente (1984). 
La estanquera de Vallecas (1985). 
Bajarse al moro (1985). 
La última pirueta (1986). 
Fuera de quicio (1987). 
Pares y nines (1989). 
El combate de Don Carnal y Doña Cuaresma (1989). 
Trampa para pájaros (1990). 
Vis a vis en Hawái (1992). 
Dígaselo con Valium (1993). 
La sombra del Tenorio (1994). 
Hora de visita (1994). 
Yonquis y yanquis (1996). 
Salvajes (1998).
En el oscuro corazón del Bosque (2009).

Published plays 

¡Viva el Duque, nuestro dueño! (1975). 
El combate de Don Carnal y Doña Cuaresma (1980). 
La verdadera y singular historia de la princesa y el dragón (1981). 
El álbum familiar (1982).
La última pirueta (1987). 
La estanquera de Vallecas (1982).
Del laberinto al 30 (1985).
Bajarse al moro (1985). 
Fuera de quicio (1985).
Pares y nines (1990).
Trampa para pájaros (1991). 
Besos para la Bella Durmiente (1994). 
Vis a vis en Hawái (1994). 
La sombra del Tenorio (1995).
Hora de visita (1996). 
Yonquis y yanquis (1997). 
El gobierno nos espía (1997). 
Matar un gato a patadas (2001).
Cuadros racistas y humor, al fresco en mi pared (2001).
Mis versiones de Plauto: Anfitrión, Casina y Miles masturbaciones (2002).
Como violé a Doña Bárabara (2004).
El romance de Carla y Luisa (2005).

Narrative works 

Paisaje desde mi bañera (1992).
¡Una de piratas! (2003). Children's book.
El romano (2003).

Essays 

Teatro español de los 80 (1985). With Fermín Cabal.
La escritura dramática (1998). Treatise on dramatic writing techniques.

See also
Alberto Miralles

References

1942 births
Living people
Spanish dramatists and playwrights
Spanish male dramatists and playwrights